Roger Jendly (born 8 March 1938) is a Swiss actor. He has appeared in 65 films and television shows since 1972. He starred in the film C'est pas tout à fait la vie dont j'avais rêvé, which was screened out of competition at the 2005 Cannes Film Festival.

Partial filmography

 Le retour d'Afrique (1973) - Marcel
 The Invitation (1973) - Le voleur
 Erica Minor (1974) - Pierre, le jeune ouvrier
 Die Auslieferung (1974) - Sergej Njetschajew
 L'escapade (1974) - Le chercheur
 The Middle of the World (1974) - Roger
 Fluchtgefahr (1974) - Der Welsche
 Pas si méchant que ça (1975)
 Jonah Who Will Be 25 in the Year 2000 (1976) - Marcel
 San Gottardo (1977) - Socialist revolutionary
 Tauwetter (1977) - Raymond
 Repérages (1977) - Jean Vallée
 Alzire oder der neue Kontinent (1978) - Rousseau
 Kleine frieren auch im Sommer (1978) - Roger
 Retour en force (1980)
 Un homme en fuite (1980) - Pierre Duschamps
 Sauve qui peut (la vie) (1980) - Customer of Isabelle's Sister
 Allons z'enfants (1981)
 The Homeless One (1981) - Vincent
 Espion, lève-toi (1982) - Le commissaire Lohmann
 La fuite en avant (1983) - Storm
 TransAtlantique (1983) - Roger Wiedmer
 The Death of Mario Ricci (1983) - Francis
 La trace (1983) - Le colporteur d'images pieuses
 Akropolis Now (1984) - Jean-Luc
 No Man's Land (1985) - L'autre douanier suisse
 La maison assassinée (1988) - Zorme
 Courir les rues (1988)
 Pestalozzi's Mountain (1989) - Kutscher
 Vent de galerne (1989) - Athanase
 La femme de Rose Hill (1989) - Marcel
 My New Partner II (1990) - Albert Le Fourgue
 Maman (1990) - Norbert
 Anna Göldin, letzte Hexe (1991) - Jeanneret
 The Savage Woman (1991) - Maurice
 Un chien sur la route (1992) - Gregoire Zidar
 Les Agneaux (1996) - Le fromager
 Alors voilà, (1997) - Loulou
 La plage noire (2001) - Gilles
 C'est pas tout à fait la vie dont j'avais rêvé (2005) - Le mari
 Des filles en noir (2010) - Tony
 Noces (Stravinsky/Ramuz) (2012) - Le monsieur au chapeau
 Tinou (2016)

References

External links

 

1938 births
Living people
Swiss male film actors